Agnes Odhiambo may refer to:

 Agnes Odhiambo (accountant), Kenyan accountant who serves as the Controller of the Budget of Kenya
 Agnes Odhiambo (activist), Kenyan human rights activist who works at Human Rights Watch